Enga Amma Rani is a 2017 Indian Tamil-language horror film directed by S. Bani. The film stars Dhansika, Yoganathan Maniam (Malaysia), Varnika, and Varsha, while Shankar Srihari, Anil Murali, and Namo Narayana play supporting roles. The film's score and soundtrack were composed by Ilaiyaraaja,.

The film's tagline says Enga Amma (our mother), and Dhansika plays the mother of two daughters (Varnika and Varsha).

Plot
In Malaysia, the single mother Thulasi (Dhansika) lives with her twin daughters Meera (Varnika) and Tara (Varsha). Her husband Sathya is missing, and she cannot return to India. Caught between financial issues and visa issues, Thulasi decides to work in a grocery store. One day, all of a sudden, Tara dies. Dr. Murali (Shankar Srihari) tells Thulasi that her daughter had Long QT syndrome, and she learns that Meera is diagnosed with the same illness.

Thulasi takes Meera to a hill station, where she starts behaving mysteriously. Thulasi soon learns that Meera is possessed by a spirit. The spirit was of a girl who once resided in the hotel with her father. Once, her father gets a lump amount as he had a profit, but his friend gets to know, and he blackmails him by saying that he kidnapped his daughter. Her father unknowingly gives the blackmailer the money and he doesn't know who the guy who was blackmailing is. He tells this to his friend without knowing he was the one who blackmailed him. He says to his friend that he is going to make a complaint. His friend suggests for him not to, but the father proceeds, while having lunch with his only daughter. Unknown to him and his daughter, the food is mixed with poison. His friend brings a local gang and makes the murder look like a suicide, and the spirit narrates to Thulasi in the midst.

Thulasi learns that if the spirit stays in her daughter's body, her daughter will survive, so she pleads for the spirit to stay, and even the spirit agrees. but the man learns of this. He goes to kill Thulasi and Meera but instead slips from the cliff. The spirit apologizes as this was her wish and thus leaves Thulasi's body. Thulasi wants to see her daughter live, so she calls Murali and requests him to take Meera along with him to India and leave Meera in her hometown. She says she will soon leave all and commits suicide so that as a spirit, she can enter her body in order to save her from her disease.

Cast
Dhansika as Thulasi
Varnika as Meera
Varsha as Tara
Shankar Srihari as Dr. Murali
Namo Narayana as Chokkalingam
Anil Murali as Rajan
Manoj Kumar as Sathya's father
Rindhu Ravi as Sathya's mother
Vaishali Thaniga as Durga Devi
Nitish Veera
Meena Karthik
VIP Krishna
Sujatha Thanika
Yoganathan Maniam in Cameo role

Production
Director S. Bani had worked as an assistant to Samuthirakani, and the location of the film is Malaysia.

Soundtrack
Lyrics written by Pazhani Bharathi.

"Amma Endru" - Anitha Karthikeyan, Aala
"Va Va Magale" - Rajashree Pathak

Reception
Deccan Chronicle gave the film a rating of two out of five stars and wrote that "Overall, Enga Amma Rani is a sincere attempt by Bani. The defects can be overlooked as the team has clearly put in a lot of passion behind this project". The Times of India gave the film the same rating and noted that " Instead, he gives us a very conventional ghost story that is lacking in both surprises and scares".

References

External links
 

Films shot in Malaysia
2017 films
2017 horror films
Films scored by Ilaiyaraaja
Films shot in Tirunelveli
2010s Tamil-language films